Self-criticism (Russian: Самокритика, Samokritika; Chinese: 自我批评, Zìwǒ pīpíng; Vietnamese: Tự phê bình) is a philosophical and political concept developed within the ideology of Marxism–Leninism, Stalinism, and Maoism. According to David Priestland, the concept of "criticism and self-criticism" developed within the Stalinist period of the Soviet Union as a way to publicly interrogate intellectuals who were suspected of possessing counter-revolutionary positions. The concept would be a major component of the political philosophy of Chinese Marxist leader Mao Zedong.

The concept of self-criticism is a component of some Marxist schools of thought, primarily that of Marxism–Leninism, Stalinism, Maoism and Marxism–Leninism–Maoism. The concept was first introduced by Joseph Stalin in his 1925 work The Foundations of Leninism and later expanded upon in his 1928 work Against Vulgarising the Slogan of Self-Criticism. The Marxist concept of self-criticism is also present in the works of Mao Zedong, who was heavily influenced by Stalin, dedicating an entire chapter of The Little Red Book to the issue. Accordingly, many party members who had fallen out of favor with the nomenklatura were forced to undergo self-criticism sessions, producing either written or verbal statements detailing their ideological errors and affirming their renewed belief in the party line.

History

Soviet Union 
According to David Priestland, the concept of politically enforced "criticism and self-criticism" originated during the 1921–1924 purges of academia within the Soviet Union. This would eventually develop into the practise of "criticism and self-criticism" campaigns in which intellectuals suspected of possessing counter-revolutionary tendencies were publicly interrogated as part of a policy of "proletariatization." This policy would be expanded past academia into the economic spheres of Russia with managers and party-bosses coerced to undergo campaigns of popular criticism.

Joseph Stalin introduced the concept of self-criticism in his 1924 work The Foundations of Leninism. He would later expand this concept in his 1928 article "Against Vulgarising the Slogan of Self-Criticism". Stalin wrote in 1928 "I think, comrades, that self-criticism is as necessary to us as air or water. I think that without it, without self-criticism, our Party could not make any headway, could not disclose our ulcers, could not eliminate our shortcomings. And shortcomings we have in plenty. That must be admitted frankly and honestly."

However, Stalin posited that self-criticism "date[s] back to the first appearance of Bolshevism in our country". Stalin stated that self-criticism was needed even after obtaining power as failing to observe weaknesses "make things easier for their enemies" and that "without self-criticism there can be no proper education of the Party, the class, and the masses". Vladimir Lenin wrote in One Step Forward, Two Steps Back (1904) that the Russian Social Democratic Labour Party engages in "self-criticism and ruthless exposure of their own shortcomings". Lenin further discussed the idea in "Left-Wing" Communism: An Infantile Disorder (1920), "Frankly admitting a mistake, ascertaining the reasons for it, analysing the circumstances which gave rise to it, and thoroughly discussing the means of correcting it—that is the earmark of a serious party". Lenin again further elaborated at a later date (1922) that revolutionaries "grew conceited, failed to see where their strength lay, and feared to speak of their weaknesses. But we shall not perish, for we do not fear to speak of our weaknesses and shall learn to overcome them".

According to the official history of the October Revolution and Soviet Union produced under Stalin, The History of the Communist Party of the Soviet Union (Bolsheviks), the concept is described briefly in the twelfth chapter, In order to be fully prepared for this turn, the Party had to be its moving spirit, and the leading role of the Party in the forthcoming elections had to be fully ensured. But this could be done only if the Party organizations themselves became thoroughly democratic in their everyday work, only if they fully observed the principles of democratic centralism in their inner-Party life, as the Party Rules demanded, only if all organs of the Party were elected, only if criticism and self-criticism in the Party were developed to the full, only if the responsibility of the Party bodies to the members of the Party were complete, and if the members of the Party themselves became thoroughly active.

Following the death of Joseph Stalin in 1953, successor to Soviet premiership Nikita Khrushchev would reaffirm the Communist Party of the Soviet Union's ideological dedication to the concepts of "criticism and self criticism" in the conclusion to the 1956 speech before the 20th Party Congress, while also denouncing the policies and actions of Stalin.

People's Republic of China 

Mao Zedong provides a significant focus on the idea of self-criticism, dedicating a whole chapter of the Little Red Book to the issue. Mao saw "conscientious practice" of self-criticism as a quality that distinguished the Chinese Communist Party from other parties. Mao championed self-criticism saying "dust will accumulate if a room is not cleaned regularly, our faces will get dirty if they are not washed regularly. Our comrades' minds and our Party's work may also collect dust, and also need sweeping and washing."

In the People's Republic of China, self-criticism—called ziwo pipan or jiǎntǎo—is an important part of Maoist practice. Mandatory self-criticism as a part of political rehabilitation common under Mao, ended by Deng Xiaoping and partially revived by Xi Jinping—is known as a struggle session in reference to class struggle.

Vietnam 
Vietnamese leader Ho Chi Minh made numerous references to the importance of self-criticism within the Vietnamese Communist Party.

Cambodia
In Democratic Kampuchea, self-criticism sessions were known as rien sot, meaning "religious education". In his memoir The Gate, François Bizot recalls observing the Khmer Rouge engaging in frequent self-criticism to reinforce group cohesion during his imprisonment in rural Cambodia in 1971:

North Korea 
North Koreans are required to engage in saenghwal ch’onghwa sessions in which they confess to wrongdoings, transgressions, and deviations from Kim Il-sung's Ten Principles for the Establishment of a Monolithic Ideological System. They are required to attend self-criticism sessions from the age of 8. Members of the ruling Korean Workers' Party can be dismissed if they do not attend sessions for longer than three months. Inmates at North Korean kwalliso camps are required to engage in self-criticism sessions, which often lead to harsh collective punishments for entire work-units. The practice was introduced in 1962 during a series of ideological disputes with the Soviet Union.

Outside the Communist Bloc 
French Marxist philosopher Louis Althusser wrote "Essays in Self-Criticism" focused on the issue of ideologically correcting ideas expressed in his prior works, most prominently For Marx and Reading Capital.

The American New Left revolutionary organization Weather Underground dedicated a chapter of their work Prairie Fire to self-criticism of their prior revolutionary strategies. Likewise, the German Red Army Faction discussed the issues of self criticism in their publication The Urban Guerrilla Concept.

See also

Mass line
Mutual Criticism
Re-education camp
Peer pressure
Political rehabilitation
Self-criticism
Struggle session
Thoughtcrime

References

Ideology of the Chinese Communist Party
Ideology of the Communist Party of the Soviet Union
Leninism
Maoist terminology
Marxism–Leninism
Socialism
Soviet phraseology
Stalinism